{{Infobox person
| name               = Tariq Nasheed
| image              = Tariq Nasheed.png
| caption            = Nasheed in 2016
| birth_name         = 
| birth_date         = 
| birth_place        = Detroit, Michigan, U.S.
| death_date         = 
| death_place        = 
| nationality        = 
| other_names        = 
| occupation         = 
| years_active       = 
| known_for          = Hidden Colors film series
| notable_works      = The Art of Mackin}}Tariq Nasheed, also known as Tariq Elite, King Flex, and K-Flex''', is an American film producer, and Internet personality. He is best known for his Hidden Colors film series, as well as his commentary on social media.

Career
Nasheed began his career as a dating expert under the "K-Flex” persona before transitioning into documentary filmmaking. Many of his dating books give instructions on how to be a pickup artist.

Nasheed produced the 2011 documentary film Hidden Colors: The Untold History of People of Aboriginal, Moor, and African Descent. Nasheed's follow-up film and DVD, Hidden Colors 2: The Triumph of Melanin, was released in 2012.

In 2013, Nasheed released the horror film The Eugenist, which he also wrote and directed. In 2014, he released Hidden Colors 3: The Rules of Racism.

In 2020, Nasheed took issue with an LGBT branded sandwich that had been sold by supermarket chain Marks & Spencers during pride month in 2019.

Mink Slide
Nasheed is the lead singer of the R&B musical group Mink Slide which debuted in 2018. Mink Slide's first album, Egyptian Musk, debuted at #12 on Billboard R&B Albums charts.

Views and reception
Nasheed is known online for his controversial commentary on race. He is a proponent of "Foundational Black Americans" (FBA), an ideology and movement he founded, which is defined as, "any person classified as Black, who can trace their bloodline lineage back to the American system of slavery. To be designated as an FBA, at least one parent must come from a non-immigrant background in The United States of America." Nasheed believes FBAs must "seek out reparations for their own" and that American-born descendants of the American slave trade have not adequately sought out resources for themselves. He has voiced opposition to African immigrants, arguing they make getting reparations for African-Americans more difficult and they allegedly take jobs and other opportunities away. 

Nasheed is known for his use of the term "bed wench" and the related term "Negro bed wench mentality". He uses the term to refer to black women who date interracially. He revived and popularized use of this term, which historically was used to disparage black women who were raped by their masters during slavery. Ebony Magazine described Nasheed’s conception of the term "bed wench" as a put-down of successful black women who challenge the institutions of black patriarchy.

According to Refinery29, Nasheed "is notorious for his misogynistic, queerphobic, xenophobic and often ahistorical commentary on Blackness in America.” Stephen Kearse of The New York Times refers to Nasheed as a "conspiracy buff".

During the COVID-19 pandemic, Nasheed was highly vocal about his distrust of the COVID-19 vaccine. He opined that, "they are using yet another Black, non-FBA doctor to do the #CovidVaccine experiment on today...Notice no one has given a SCIENTIFIC reason as to why we are only seeing Black people injected with this new vaccine" and that the "white powers in control" completely ignored requests for "reparations, decent employment, decent education, decent housing, no police killings."

Books
 Play or Be Played: What Every Female Should Know About Men, Dating, and Relationships The Mack’ Within The Elite Way: 10 Rules Men Must Know in Order to Deal With Women The Art of Gold DiggingFilmography
 Hidden Colors (2011)
 Hidden Colors 2 (2012)
 The Eugenist (2013)
 Hidden Colors 3 (2014)Buck Breaking'' (2021)

References

Living people
African-American film producers
African-American film directors
American film producers
Black supremacists
American media personalities
American podcasters
American documentary film producers
American conspiracy theorists
Writers from Detroit
American Internet celebrities
American social commentators
Year of birth missing (living people)
21st-century African-American people
Seduction community
Infotainers